Lisa Linn Kanae is an English professor at Kapiʻolani Community College and is best known for her poetry and short stories written in Pidgin.

Early life and education 
Born and raised in Kapahulu, Oʻahu, Kanae is of Hawaiian, Chinese, Japanese, and Filipino ancestry. Before returning to college after a ten-year hiatus, she worked as a secretary. Beginning at Kapiʻolani Community College, Kanae later transferred to the University of Hawaiʻi at Mānoa, where she earned her B.A. and then went on to earn her M.A. in 1999.

Career 
Kanae is an English professor at Kapiʻolani Community College, where she chairs the LLL (Languages, Linguistics and Literature) Department. Kanae is a recipient of the 2009 Cades Award for Literature for Emerging Writers.

Kanae was an editor for Hawaiʻi Review and an editorial assistant for ‘Ōiwi.  She is best known for being a Hawaiʻi author that writes in Pidgin, but has also tried her hand at spoken-word poetry, too. She has written for Hawaiʻi journal Hybolics.

Bibliography

References 

Native Hawaiian writers
University of Hawaiʻi at Mānoa alumni
University of Hawaiʻi at Mānoa faculty
Indigenous writers of the Americas
20th-century American women writers
American women academics
Year of birth missing (living people)
Living people
21st-century American women